John Hooper (1532 – 1572) was an English politician.

He was a Member (MP) of the Parliament of England for Salisbury in October 1553, November 1554, 1555 and 1558.

References

1572 deaths
Year of birth uncertain
English MPs 1553 (Mary I)
English MPs 1554–1555
English MPs 1555
English MPs 1558